The 1980 PBA Open Conference Finals was the best-of-5 basketball championship series of the 1980 PBA Open Conference, and the conclusion of the conference's playoffs. 
 
U/Tex Wranglers wins their 2nd PBA title with a 3–2 series victory over Toyota Tamaraws. The deciding fifth game became known as the "last 16 seconds" when U/Tex wiped out a four-point lead by Toyota in regulation and forced the game into overtime.

Qualification

Games summary

Game 1

Game 2

Sonny Jaworski scored a finals record eight triples and finished the game with 28 points. The Tamaraws trailed 35–40 when Jaworski flipped his first three-point shot in the second quarter. He followed it with two more triples and his third three-pointer push Toyota ahead by two, 44–42. The Tamaraws went ahead by seven points, 66–59, at the end of the second quarter with Jaworski firing three more three-point shots late in the period.

U/Tex twice tied Toyota early in the fourth and actually went ahead, 94–93. A 7–3 blast sparked by Jaworski's last three-point shot of the evening sent the Tamaraws back on top, 100–97. The Big J fouled out with 1:45 left and Toyota up by only three, 102–99. Francis Arnaiz and Abe King put together a five-point cluster that wrapped up the match for the Tamaraws.

Game 3

Game 4

Game 5

Toyota’s 92–87 edge on Jaworski’s triple was wiped out by Lim Eng Beng’s three-point play as he had already released his shot and drew Jaworski’s sixth and final foul.

Francis Arnaiz' go-ahead layup gave Toyota a 94–90 edge with 16 seconds left in regulation. The Tamaraws were on their way of clinching the title when a series of mental lapses allowed the Wranglers to come back. With still three fouls away from the penalty, the Tamaraws allowed import Aaron James to drive unmolested towards the basket with an undergoal stab, a timeout was called by Toyota coach Fort Acuna with time down to 11 seconds. As the Tamaraws inbounded, the Wranglers went on a press and anticipated the play, Arnie Tuadles was doubled team by Lim Eng Beng and Matthew Gaston, relayed to Abe King on the other side of the front court, Glenn McDonald intercepted the ball and pounced on for a breakaway with five seconds to go, he was fouled by Arnaiz going to the hoop with two seconds remaining in regulation, McDonald calmly sank the two free throws to extend the game into overtime.

A see-saw battle ensued in the extension period with both teams obviously feeling the championship pressure, Bogs Adornado converted on a long attempt with 1:25 left in the ballgame, which later proved to be the winning basket as both teams would commit a series of misses until the final buzzer sounded.

Rosters

Broadcast notes

References

External links
The biggest meltdowns in PBA finals history @FHM.com.ph

1980
1980 PBA season
Toyota Super Corollas games
U/Tex Wranglers games
PBA Open Conference Finals
PBA Open Conference Finals